BC Sirius Mureșul Târgu Mureș, is a Romanian women basketball club based in Târgu Mureș, which currently participates in the Liga Națională, the top-tier league in Romania. The team founded as BC Sirius in 2007 was moved in the summer of 2018 to the sports club of Municipality of Târgu Mureș and was renamed as CSM Târgu Mureș. However, it was rebranded back to its original form one year later, following financial mismanagement by the local authorities.

Honours
 Liga I
Winners (1): 2015–16

Current roster

}}

References

External links
 Eurobasket 

Târgu Mureș
Basketball teams in Romania
Women's basketball teams in Romania
Basketball teams established in 2007
2007 establishments in Romania